The Pierce Street Historic District is a residential historic district in Lynchburg, Virginia.  The district consists of two blocks of Pierce Street, and one adjoining block each of Fillmore and Buchanan Streets.  The area consists of mostly vernacular houses with some Folk Victorian and Craftsman styling.  Most of this housing stock was built before 1950.  The neighborhood was developed as a small enclave of African-Americans which was otherwise surrounded by white neighborhoods.  The area is notable for producing a number of significant African-American intellectuals, including Anne Spencer, a poet whose house (the Anne Spencer House) is separately listed on the National Register.  Also located in the district is the Dr. Robert Walter Johnson House and Tennis Court.

The district was listed on the National Register of Historic Places in 2014.

See also
National Register of Historic Places listings in Lynchburg, Virginia

References

Historic districts in Lynchburg, Virginia
Buildings and structures in Lynchburg, Virginia
National Register of Historic Places in Lynchburg, Virginia
Historic districts on the National Register of Historic Places in Virginia